The 2006–07 season was the 100th season in the history of Atalanta B.C. and the club's first season back in the top flight of Italian football. In addition to the domestic league, Atalanta participated in this season's edition of the Coppa Italia.

Competitions

Overview

Serie A

League table

Results summary

Results by round

Matches

Coppa Italia

Statistics

Appearances and goals

|-
! colspan=14 style=background:#DCDCDC; text-align:center| Goalkeepers

|-
! colspan=14 style=background:#DCDCDC; text-align:center| Defenders

|-
! colspan=14 style=background:#DCDCDC; text-align:center| Midfielders

|-
! colspan=14 style=background:#DCDCDC; text-align:center| Forwards

References

Atalanta B.C. seasons
Atalanta